Hypenodes palustris is a species of moth in the family Erebidae. It was described by Douglas C. Ferguson in 1954. It is found in North America, including Alaska, Maryland, Minnesota, New Brunswick, Nova Scotia, Ontario, Quebec and Wisconsin.

References

Moths described in 1954
Hypenodinae
Moths of North America